The Doubles luge competition at the 1972 Winter Olympics in Sapporo was held on 10 February, at Sapporo Teine.
A malfunctioning starting gate cancelled the results of the first run. Italy, whose doubles team of Paul Hildgartner and Walter Plaikner won the first run, protested to event officials the results should stand since all contestants had suffered equally, but to no avail. After the protest was denied, a rerun was ordered.

Hildgartner and Plaikner won the first run of the rerun event while the East German team of Horst Hörnlein and Reinhard Bredow had the fastest second run. The combined times were equal for the only time in Winter Olympic luge history. The International Luge Federation consulted with IOC President Avery Brundage on this matter, and gold medals were awarded to both teams as a result. By the time of the 1976 Winter Olympics, artificial track luge would be timed in thousandths of a second (0.001) rather than hundredths of a second (0.01) in an effort to avoid ties. That would prove effective until the FIL European Luge Championships 2008 at Cesana, when another tie occurred. This tie was again in the men's doubles event and it again involved Italy and Germany (East and West Germany reunified in 1990) only this time it was for a bronze medal rather than gold.

Results

References

Luge at the 1972 Winter Olympics
Men's events at the 1972 Winter Olympics